Meteghan is an Acadian fishing community along the shores of Baie Sainte-Marie in Clare municipality, Digby County, Nova Scotia, Canada. It is 25 miles northeast of Yarmouth.

History
Founded in 1785 by Prudent Robichaud, Joseph LeBlanc, and other Acadian families, it draws its name from the Mi'kmaq term "Mitihikan" meaning blue rocks.

Economy
This community is also the French Shore's busiest port with draggers, trawlers, seiners, cod, crab and lobster boats docking  there. The fishing industry has long been the main source of income in Meteghan. Clare's shipbuilding industry began in Meteghan in 1890 with the construction of the first dry dock built in conjunction with a shipyard. Notable vessels include the Royal Canadian Navy training schooner HMCS Venture, built in 1937. The largest remaining shipyard is the A.F. Theriault & Sons Shipyard in nearby Meteghan River.

It is home to Smuggler's Cove Provincial Park. Meteghan is the largest of several communities that make up the Clare Municipal District.

External links
Municipality of Clare
Baie Sainte-Marie, Nova Scotia's French Acadian Shore

General Service Areas in Nova Scotia
Communities in Digby County, Nova Scotia